Italy competed at the 1968 European Indoor Games in Madrid, Spain, from 9 to 10 March 1968.

Medalists

Top eight

Two Italian athletes reached the top eight in this edition of the championships.
Men

Women
In this edition of the championships no women from the Italian national team participated..

See also
 Italy national athletics team

References

External links
 EAA official site 

1968
1968 European Indoor Games
1968 in Italian sport